Launch Complex 6  may refer to:

 Cape Canaveral Air Force Station Launch Complex 6, a launch site which was used by Redstone and Jupiter series rockets and missiles
 Vandenberg AFB Space Launch Complex 6, a launch pad and support area